Maligatenna Raja Maha Vihara (Sinhalaː මාලිගාතැන්න රජ මහා විහාරය/මාලිගාතැන්න ආරණ්‍ය සේනාසනය) is an ancient Cave temple located in Malwatuhiripitiya village, Gampaha District, Sri Lanka.

Currently this temple has been recognized as an archaeological protected site in Gampaha District by Archaeological department.

History
The history of Maligathenna Raja Maha Vihara is believed to be goes back to the time period of Anuradhapura Kingdom. According to Brahmi cave inscriptions found in Warana Raja Maha Vihara and Pilikutthuwa Raja Maha Vihara, those are temples located near to Maligatenna, it can be assumed that this vihara may also have been on abode of Buddhist monks.

folklores
There are two main folklores describe how this temple became an important place for kings and their ministers during the enemy invasion periods. According to the first folklore this temple is considered as one of place that King Valagamba used to hide during the Chola invasions in Anuradhapura.

As the other folklore, this vihara was the first place where the tooth relic of Buddha was hidden for the safety (before being carried to Delgamuwa Raja Maha Vihara), when King Don Juan Dharmapala of Kotte kingdom embraced Christianity during the Portuguese period.

Structures
The temple has been mainly divided into two grounds called Pahala Maluwa and Ihala Maluwa. In the pahala maluwa an image house, Bo tree, an ancient Devalaya and Stupa can be seen. On the top of the rock a rampart surrounded Bo tree and a Stupa has been built. There are number of rock caves with drip ledges are found in the vihara premises. In one of them an engraved stone door frame can be seen. According to the view of professor Senarath Paranavithana that door frame may belongs to the period of 8th century of A.D.

See also
 List of Archaeological Protected Monuments in Gampaha District

References

External links
 Maligathenna Rajamaha Viharaya

Buddhist temples in Gampaha District
Buddhist caves in Sri Lanka
Archaeological protected monuments in Gampaha District